Griffin is a special service area within the Rural Municipality of Griffin No. 66 in the Canadian province of Saskatchewan. Listed as a designated place by Statistics Canada, the community had a population of 111 (a 73.4% increase from 2011) in the Canada 2016 Census. The community is also the seat of the Rural Municipality of Griffin No. 66.

Demographics 

See also

 List of communities in Saskatchewan
 Special Service Area

References 

Designated places in Saskatchewan
Griffin No. 66, Saskatchewan
Special service areas in Saskatchewan
Division No. 2, Saskatchewan